Adnanul Karim Memon (born 8 January 1971) has been Justice of the Sindh High Court since 30 November 2016.

References

1971 births
Living people
Judges of the Sindh High Court
Pakistani judges